This battle took place on 16 May 1644 during the Danish-Swedish War near List Deep, between Sylt and Rømø in western Denmark. Nine Danish ships under King Christian IV forced a retreat back into List Deep of 26 smaller Dutch ships (13 under Marten Thijsen and 13 under Hendrik Gerritsen) which had come to assist Sweden against Denmark. 4 more Dutch ships from Marcus' squadron appeared during the battle but took no part.

Ships involved

Denmark
Trefoldighed 48
Tre Løver 46
Lindorm 38
Norske Løve 30
Neptunus 28
Sorte Rytter 24
Phenix 20
Postillion 14
Hollandske Fregat 12

Netherlands (Thijssen)
Gulde Swaen (flag)
Grooten Dolphien (2nd flag of Gerritsen)
Lange Bark
10 others plus 4 under Marcus

References

1644 in Denmark
1644
Rømø 
Battles of the Thirty Years' War
Sylt
Battles involving Sweden
Battles involving Denmark
Conflicts in 1644